Bjarne Hansen (25 September 1894 – 28 July 1915) was a Norwegian footballer. He played once for the Norway national football team in 1913.

He played for Larvik Turn for five years. He died at Skien Hospital. At his funeral, members of Larvik Turn were casket-bearers, as well as the club flag being flown.

References

1894 births
1915 deaths
Norwegian footballers
Norway international footballers
Larvik Turn players
Association football forwards